Chusquea gigantea is a species of bamboo in the family Poaceae, native to central Chile. A clumping bamboo with solid stems, it has gained the Royal Horticultural Society's Award of Garden Merit.

References

gigantea
Endemic flora of Chile
Flora of central Chile
Plants described in 1999